William Shepard was a Massachusetts soldier and legislator.

William Shepard may also refer to:

 William Biddle Shepard, North Carolina legislator

See also
William Shepard Wetmore, American businessman and philanthropist
William Sheppard (disambiguation)
William Shepherd (disambiguation)